John Gooders (10 January 1937 – 18 May 2010) was a British writer who first came to prominence with his first book Where to Watch Birds. At the time he was a teacher, and a lecturer at Avery Hill College.

Career in television

In 1970, after taking two months off on the Churchill Fellowship in which he studied bird migration through North Africa, he launched his own magazine called The World of Birds. He then finished up working for Anglia Television's Survival series, and edited the company's house magazine The World of Survival.

He appeared in the 1975 BBC programme In Deepest Britain, with Richard Mabey and other naturalists, giving an unscripted narration of the wildlife observed during a country walk.

Later life

John then devoted himself to full-time writing about birds and natural history, also forming a successful nature tour company. He chaired the Friends of Rye Harbour Nature Reserve for a decade and served on the management committee of the Reserve. He also became the mayor of Winchelsea. He died in May 2010. The John Gooders memorial Hide at Rye Harbour was opened on 21 October 2013 in the presence of Robbie, his wife, and other members of the family.

Bibliography

Footnotes

British ornithological writers
1937 births
2010 deaths